William Isabel was an English politician who was MP for Plympton Erle in 1407. Their History of Parliament Online Biography has only one word: "unidentified".

References

14th-century births
15th-century deaths
English MPs 1407
Members of the Parliament of England for Plympton Erle